Porúbka may refer to several villages and municipalities in Slovakia:

 Porúbka, Bardejov District
 Porúbka, Humenné District
 Porúbka, Sobrance District
 Porúbka, Žilina District